Phyllostemonodaphne is a monotypic genus of flowering plants in the family Lauraceae containing the single species Phyllostemonodaphne geminiflora. It is endemic to Brazil, where it is known from Espírito Santo, Minas Gerais, and the state of Rio de Janeiro. Most collections have been made near the city of Rio de Janeiro.

References

Endemic flora of Brazil
Endangered plants
Lauraceae genera
Monotypic Laurales genera
Taxonomy articles created by Polbot
Lauraceae